What So Not is an electronic music project by Australian record producer Emoh Instead (stage name of Christopher John Emerson). What So Not has toured the world, playing in various festivals, including Coachella Valley Music and Arts Festival, Pukkelpop, Ultra Music Festival and Lollapalooza. What So Not is best known for his hits such as Innerbloom (What So Not Remix) (by RÜFÜS DU SOL),"Gemini" (featuring George Maple), "Jaguar", "High You Are" and "Tell Me" (with RL Grime). He has featured on charts such as the Australian Singles Chart, Triple J Hottest 100, and USA iTunes Dance Album chart. He released his debut album titled Not All the Beautiful Things on 9 March 2018.

History

2010–2017: Career beginnings
What So Not started as a project between record producer Emoh Instead and Flume. On 13 November 2011, What So Not released their debut EP, 7 Dollar Bill. During this time, they had released several remixes of artists such as Peking Duk, Tom Piper, and Major Lazer,. In early 2013, they embarked on the Massive Universe Tour, in several venues across Australia. On 28 May 2013, they released their second EP, The Quack, featuring a collaboration with Action Bronson on label Owsla.

The duo released the song, "Jaguar" on 6 December 2013.

On 24 June 2014, What So Not and RL Grime released their single, "Tell Me", with Chris Martins from Spin describing the track as "of both melodic might and percussive ferocity".

In February 2015, Flume announced his departure from What So Not, citing that he and Emoh Instead had been moving in different creative directions, and stated that the upcoming Gemini EP would be What So Not's last release as a duo. "Gemini" featuring George Maple, the first track from the EP, debuted on 9 May 2015. The track was named on Triple J Hottest 100 later that year and peaked at number 52 on the Australian Singles Chart.

Gemini was released as a free download on 18 December 2015, which featured collaborations with artists Dillon Francis, Tunji Ige and KLP (musician). The EP was downloaded over 800,000 times, charted globally on iTunes Electronic EP chart and was named to various year-end "best of" lists.

In November 2015, What So Not, Baauer and George Maple co-produced a track for Australian rapper Tkay Maidza, titled "Ghost". The song was premiered on Triple J. On 9 September 2016, What So Not released his first EP as a solo artist, Divide & Conquer, which included previously released track "Lone".

In October 2016, What So Not, George Maple and Djemba Djemba co-produced a track on Australian rapper Tkay Maidza's debut album, titled "Afterglow".

On 3 November 2016, RL Grime released the single "Waiting" in collaboration with What So Not and Skrillex which was in production since 2013. The track's release was teased through a promotional video which parodied chat-line advertisements and featured footage of 1980-era-influenced vixens with a phone number flashing across the screen, where by calling the number listeners can hear the song in full.

A collaboration between What So Not and New York artist LPX, "Better", was released on 8 September 2017; and was debuted on Australian Radio Station Triple J on 7 September 2017. "I had a few productions I’d been working on in this sonic field but struggled to find a vocalist with the right attitude and tone to fit. Lizzy and I clicked instantly on this trajectory & began jamming on the tune," stated What So Not about the track's production. He released "Be Ok Again" which featured Australian musician Daniel Johns on 28 November 2017. The track was produced after Johns noticed What So Not working with Slumberjack as he walked by the studio, which prompted him to invite What So Not to work together at his Newcastle studio.

2018–2020: Not All the Beautiful Things
On 31 January 2018, What So Not announced the arrival of his debut album titled Not All the Beautiful Things which was released on 9 March 2018. The album featured collaborations with several artists, including Skrillex, Slumberjack, San Holo, and American rock band Toto. Together with the announcement, he released lead album single "Stuck In Orbit" which was co-produced with Jono Ma from Australian psychedelic dance band Jagwar Ma. What So Not released a third album single titled "Beautiful", a collaboration with Swedish singer/songwriter Winona Oak, on 27 February 2018 and announced a national Australia tour for his "Beautiful Things' World Tour" where he visited cities Perth, Adelaide, Melbourne, Sydney and Brisbane in June 2018.

What So Not's first single of 2019, "We Can Be Friends" featuring American singer Herizen, was released on 22 January 2019. He previously met the singer at a songwriting workshop in Nicaragua, while citing American record producer and rapper J Dilla as the track's main inspiration.

On 6 February 2020, What So Not announced he was "taking a break", stating "I want to pull myself out of the 'routine' of it all and make sure everything I do is 110%." followed by radio silence on his social media.

2021–present: Anomaly
On 8 January 2021, What So Not returned from hiatus with a remix for Run The Jewels featuring Pharrell Williams and Zack de la Rocha stating "I was honored to get the nod to put this record out, not only with RTJ, but also my childhood heroes Zack and Pharrell." 

In April 2021 What So Not announced a "new era" and subsequently release of "The Change" featuring DMA's. NME said "The track channels the Manchester influences of DMA’S 2020 record ‘The Glow’, but flips the balance of rock and dance to the latter, aping an Underworld-style rave."

Discography

 Not All the Beautiful Things (2018)
 Anomaly (2022)

Awards and nominations

AIR Awards
The Australian Independent Record Awards (commonly known informally as AIR Awards) is an annual awards night to recognise, promote and celebrate the success of Australia's Independent Music sector.

|-
| AIR Awards of 2019
|"Beautiful" (featuring Winona Oak)
| Best Independent Dance, Electronica Or Club Single
| 
| 
|-

Environmental Music Prize
The Environmental Music Prize is a quest to find a theme song to inspire action on climate and conservation. It commenced in 2022.

! 
|-
| 2022
| "Messin' Me Up" (featuring Evan Giia)
| Environmental Music Prize
| 
| 
|-

Queensland Music Awards
The Queensland Music Awards (previously known as Q Song Awards) are annual awards celebrating Queensland, Australia's brightest emerging artists and established legends. They commenced in 2006.

 (wins only)
! 
|-
! scope="row"| 2022
|  "Every Single Time" Example featuring What So Not & Lucy Lucy
| Video of the Year
| 
| 
|}

References

External links
 
 

Australian electronic musicians
2010 establishments in Australia
Musical groups established in 2010
Australian house musicians
Australian DJs
Owsla artists
Counter Records artists
Electronic dance music DJs